NewDay, formerly SAV Credit, is a financial services company specialising in providing credit products to consumers in the United Kingdom.

History 
The company was established in 2000.

On 13 May 2013 the company completed the purchase of Santander UK's store card business, including branded cards issued for retailers including Topshop, Dorothy Perkins, House of Fraser and Debenhams. Santander continued to operate the cards business until 1 April 2014, when SAV took full control and was renamed NewDay.

In March 2015, it was rumoured that NewDay was for sale, valuing the company at around $1.49 billion.

In March 2019, John Hourican was named CEO of NewDay, succeeding James Corcoran to the position.

It was announced in May 2022 that John Lewis Partnership's white-label agreement with HSBC UK would end later that year, with new and existing Partnership Card accounts migrated to a reshaped service run by NewDay.

Structure 
NewDay is organised into two limited companies: NewDay Ltd and NewDay Cards Ltd. Both are authorised and regulated by the Financial Conduct Authority, and subscribe to the Lending Code.

Investors
Private equity firms Cinven and CVC Capital Partners are investors, both having representatives on its board of directors.

References

British companies established in 2000
Financial services companies established in 2000
Financial services companies of the United Kingdom
2000 establishments in the United Kingdom
Companies established in 2000